Bythocrotus is a genus of Caribbean jumping spiders that was first described by Eugène Louis Simon in 1903.  it contains only two species, found only on Hispaniola: Bythocrotus cephalotes and Bythocrotus crypticus.

References

Fauna of Hispaniola
Salticidae
Salticidae genera
Spiders of the Caribbean
Arthropods of the Dominican Republic